Ernst Motzfeldt (1 March 1842 – 10 June 1915) was a Norwegian member of the Council of State Division in Stockholm (Norske statsråder i Stockholm) 1893-1894  and Minister of Justice from 1894 to 1895 within the Second Cabinet of Prime Minister Emil Stang  

Motzfeldt was born in Christiania to Ulrik Anton Motzfeldt and Anna Pauline Birch. He graduated as cand.jur. in 1864, and was named as a Supreme Court Justice from 1890 to 1912. He chaired the Norwegian Red Cross from 1905 to 1908. He was decorated as Knight, First Class of the Order of St. Olav in 1891, and Commander in 1893, and was a Commander of the Order of the Polar Star.

References

1842 births
1915 deaths
Politicians from Oslo
Government ministers of Norway
Supreme Court of Norway justices
Presidents of the Norwegian Red Cross
Ministers of Justice of Norway
Judges from Oslo